Nirma Gharti Magar is a Wushu competitor and gold medalist at the 2016 South Asian Games.

Nima's gold was the fifth gold medal secured by Nepal from wushu in the history of South Asian Games. Bina Khadka and Rajkumar Rasaili had earned gold medals in wushu in 2006 in Colombo and Binita Maharjan and Angbabu Lama in 2010 in Dhaka.

References

Living people
Wushu practitioners at the 2018 Asian Games
Year of birth missing (living people)
Asian Games competitors for Nepal
South Asian Games medalists in wushu
South Asian Games gold medalists for Nepal